Poovathur is a village in the Orathanadu taluk of Thanjavur district, Tamil Nadu, India. As per the 2001 census, Poovathur West had a total population of 2086, with 987 males and 1099 females. The literacy rate was 75.89.

References 

 

Villages in Thanjavur district